The Gibe River (also Great Gibe River) is by far the largest tributary of the Omo River in Ethiopia and typically flowing south-southeast. Consequently, the whole drainage basin is sometimes called the Omo-Gibe River Basin with the Gibe and the Omo draining the upper and lower reaches, respectively.

Located in southwest Ethiopia, the Gibe River is not navigable, like almost all rivers in the country.

Overview
The Gibe rises at an elevation of more than 2,000 m north of Bila town and west of the Chomen swamp (specifically, from Gudeya Bila woreda, which is located in the East Welega Zone, Oromia Region). The river is then flowing generally to the southeast to its confluence with the Wabe River. Its tributaries include the Amara, Alanga and Gilgel Gibe rivers. The southern drainage area of the Gibe includes the historic Gibe region, where a number of the former kingdoms of the Oromo and Sidama peoples were located. The Gibe River terminates at the confluence with the Wabe River at an elevation of 1060 m from where the resulting river downstream is called the Omo River.

Although its banks and watershed have been inhabited since time immemorial, it is first mentioned in the Royal Chronicle of Emperor Sarsa Dengel, who campaigned to the north of it in 1566. The first European to see the Gibe was the Portuguese António Fernandes, who crossed the Gibe in 1613 as he left Ennarea and entered Janjero, and later described it as carrying "more Water than the Nile". No other European visited the Gibe until the 19th century, so his account remained the authoritative account over the next centuries and preferred to information obtained from native travellers.

References

Rivers of Ethiopia
Omo River (Ethiopia)